Vallet is a commune in the Loire-Atlantique department in western France. The town is located in the Muscadet region.

Vallet is twinned with Alcester, Warwickshire, United Kingdom.

Population

See also
Communes of the Loire-Atlantique department

References

Communes of Loire-Atlantique